TFW or TfW may refer to:

 Temporary foreign worker program in Canada
 TracFone Wireless
 Transport for Wales
 Transport for Wales Rail

See also 
 TFW No GF